Hacienda Buena Unión in the municipality of San Germán, Puerto Rico was built in 1870.  It is also known as Trapiche del Guamá or Hacienda Acosta.

The hacienda was listed on the U.S. National Register of Historic Places in 1983.

See also
National Register of Historic Places listings in San Germán, Puerto Rico

Notes

References

National Register of Historic Places in Puerto Rico
Buildings and structures in San Germán, Puerto Rico
Buena Unión
1870 establishments in Puerto Rico
Buildings and structures completed in 1870